Julian Eberhard (born 9 November 1986) is an Austrian former biathlete.

His debut was at the Biathlon World Cup in 2006. During the 2015–16 season Eberhard got his first individual victory, winning sprint in Khanty-Mansiysk. His brother Tobias Eberhard is also a biathlete.

Biathlon results
All results are sourced from the International Biathlon Union.

Olympic Games
0 medals

*The mixed relay was added as an event in 2014.

World Championships
1 medal (1 bronze)

*During Olympic seasons competitions are only held for those events not included in the Olympic program.
**The mixed relay was added as an event in 2005.

Individual victories
4 victories (3 Sp, 1 Ms)

*Results are from UIPMB and IBU races which include the Biathlon World Cup, Biathlon World Championships and the Winter Olympic Games.

References

External links

1986 births
Living people
Austrian male biathletes
Biathlon World Championships medalists
Biathletes at the 2018 Winter Olympics
Olympic biathletes of Austria
People from Zell am See District
Sportspeople from Salzburg (state)